Forest Glen is an unincorporated community in Tippecanoe Township, Kosciusko County, in the U.S. state of Indiana.

Geography

References

Unincorporated communities in Kosciusko County, Indiana
Unincorporated communities in Indiana